Horatio N. Smith (March 20, 1820 – August 5 1886) was a member of the Wisconsin State Assembly and the Wisconsin State Senate.

Biography
Horatio Nelson Smith was born on March 20, 1820, in Royalton, Vermont, son of Colonel Stafford Smith. His father was a veteran of the War of 1812.

Smith moved to Sheboygan, in the Wisconsin Territory, in 1847 and to Milwaukee, Wisconsin in 1880.

Career
Smith was elected as Democrat to the Wisconsin State Assembly for 1850 before representing the 1st District of the Wisconsin State Senate from 1853 to 1854. In 1874, he was appointed Warden of the Wisconsin State Prison and remained in the job for six years.  After his public service, he moved to Milwaukee and became employed with the Milwaukee & Northern Railroad, working on the northern extension of the railroad.  He retired after suffering an accident in 1885.

Personal life and family

Horatio Smith married Laura Anner Chase on Christmas of 1844. Chase was a granddaughter of Episcopal bishop Philander Chase, niece of U.S. Senator Dudley Chase and cousin of U.S. Representative Dudley Chase Denison, and U.S. Treasury Secretary and Chief Justice of the U.S. Supreme Court Salmon P. Chase. They had six children.

After his 1885 accident, Smith went to California with his family.  On the way back he suffered a pulmonary hemorrhage.  He recovered for a short time, but died on August 5, 1886, in Hilbert, Wisconsin. He was buried in Plymouth, Wisconsin where he was a vestryman.

References

People from Royalton, Vermont
Politicians from Sheboygan, Wisconsin
Politicians from Milwaukee
Democratic Party Wisconsin state senators
Democratic Party members of the Wisconsin State Assembly
American prison wardens
1820 births
1886 deaths
Burials in Wisconsin
19th-century American politicians